is a train station on the Keihan Railway Keihan Main Line located in Asahi-ku, Osaka, Osaka Prefecture, Japan.

Layout
The station has 2 island platforms serving 2 tracks each on the 2nd level.  The inner tracks are fenced because only local trains stop at this station.

Adjacent stations

Asahi-ku, Osaka
Railway stations in Japan opened in 1931
Railway stations in Osaka